Madonna and Child with Two Saints is a c.1475 tempera and gold on panel altarpiece by Neri di Bicci, now in the Montreal Museum of Fine Arts, to which it was left by John W. Tempest in 1892. It is now on show in the Jean-Noël Desmarais pavilion on level 4 of the Museum.
 
It is a Madonna and Child of the Maestà and sacra conversazione types. To the right is Michael the Archangel with armour, sword and scales, treading Satan beneath his feet. To the left is Saint Blaise dressed as a bishop with the instruments of his martyrdom. Below the main panel is a predella centred around the Dead Christ, with Tobias, Raphael, St Peter and the Virgin Mary to the left and saints John the Evangelist, Lawrence and Francis of Assisi to the right, all framed by two coats of arms, probably those of the donors.

References

Paintings depicting Michael (archangel)
Paintings of the Madonna and Child
Paintings depicting Saint Peter
Paintings depicting John the Apostle
Paintings of Francis of Assisi
Paintings of Raphael (archangel)
Paintings depicting Tobias
1475 paintings
Paintings of Saint Blaise
Paintings in the collection of the Montreal Museum of Fine Arts